M. Thennavan is an Indian politician and Former Minister and Member of the Legislative Assembly of Tamil Nadu. He was elected to the Tamil Nadu legislative assembly as an  Anna Dravida Munnetra Kazhagam (Jayalalitha) candidate from Ramanathapuram constituency in  1991 election.

Personal life 
He was born in Kallikudi, Ramnad district. His father name is Muthalagu Pillai and his mother name is Pechiyammal. He is the only son of his family. He is now in the Dravida Munnetra Kazhagam Party and having a post of Ilakkiya Ani Thalaivar. His wife's name is Mariyammal Thennavan and he lives in Karaikkudi as of now.

References 

All India Anna Dravida Munnetra Kazhagam politicians
Dravida Munnetra Kazhagam politicians
Living people
Year of birth missing (living people)
Tamil Nadu MLAs 1991–1996